Santa Anita is a USGS place name within the city of Arcadia in Los Angeles County, California. Formerly within Rancho Santa Anita, it lies at an elevation of 558 feet (170 m).

References

Arcadia, California
Former settlements in Los Angeles County, California